Live at the Roxy or Live at the Roxy May 3 91 is the second full-length live album by Canadian rock band The Tragically Hip.

The album was recorded on May 3, 1991, at the Roxy Theatre in Hollywood, California. The album was released as a standalone album on June 24, 2022, after previously being included in the 30th anniversary box set edition of Road Apples, which was released on October 15, 2021. 

The album features two songs which were previously released by the band as B-sides to singles in the Road Apples era: the ad-libbed "killer whale tank" version of "New Orleans Is Sinking", and the "double suicide" version of "Highway Girl".

Track listing

Personnel
Gord Downie – lead vocals
Rob Baker – lead guitar
Paul Langlois – rhythm guitar
Gord Sinclair – bass guitar, backing vocals
Johnny Fay – drums

Charts

References

The Tragically Hip albums
2022 live albums